A geomagnetic excursion, like a geomagnetic reversal, is a significant change in the Earth's magnetic field. Unlike reversals, an excursion is not a "permanent" re-orientation of the large-scale field, but rather represents a dramatic, typically a (geologically) short-lived change in field intensity, with a variation in pole orientation of up to 45° from the previous position.

Excursion events typically only last a few thousand to a few tens of thousands of years, and often involve declines in field strength to between 0 and 20% of normal. Unlike full reversals, excursions are generally not recorded around the entire globe. This is certainly due in part to them not registering well in the sedimentary record, but it also seems likely that excursions may not typically extend through the entire global geomagnetic field. There are significant exceptions, however.

Occurrence
Except for recent periods of the geologic past, it is not well known how frequently geomagnetic excursions occur. Unlike geomagnetic reversals, which are easily detected by the change in field direction, the relatively short-lived excursions can be easily overlooked in long duration, coarsely resolved, records of past geomagnetic field intensity. Present knowledge suggests that they are around ten times more abundant than reversals, with up to 12 excursions documented within the current reversal period Brunhes–Matuyama reversal.

Geomagnetic excursions for the Brunhes geomagnetic chron are relatively well described.

Geomagnetic excursions in the Matuyama, Gauss and Gilbert chrons are also reported and new possible excursions are suggested for these chrons based on analysis of the deep drilling cores from Lake Baikal and their comparison with the oceanic core (ODP) and Chinese loess records.

Possible causes
Scientific opinion is divided on what causes geomagnetic excursions. The dominant hypothesis is that they are an inherent instability of the dynamo processes that generates the magnetic field. Others suggest that excursions occur when the magnetic field is reversed only within the liquid outer core, and complete reversals would occur when the outer and inner core are both affected.

Disorganized  dynamo hypothesis
The most popular hypothesis is that they are an inherent aspect of the dynamo processes that maintain the Earth's magnetic field. In computer simulations, it is observed that magnetic field lines can sometimes become tangled and disorganized through the chaotic motions of liquid metal in the Earth's core. In such cases, this spontaneous disorganization can cause decreases in the magnetic field as perceived at the Earth's surface.

This scenario is supported by observed tangling and spontaneous disorganization in the solar magnetic field (the 22 or 11 year solar cycle). However, the equivalent process in the sun invariably leads to a reversal of the solar magnetic field: It has never been observed to recover without a full-scale change in its orientation.

Outer-core inner-core opposition hypothesis
The work of David Gubbins suggests that excursions occur when the magnetic field is reversed only within the liquid outer core; reversals occur when the inner core is also affected. This fits well with observations of events within the current chron of reversals taking 3,000–7,000 years to complete, while excursions typically last 500–3,000 years. However, this timescale does not hold true for all events, and the need for separate generation of fields has been contested, since the changes can be spontaneously generated in mathematical models.

External driver hypothesis

Plate tectonic-driven
A minority opinion, held by such figures as Richard A. Muller, is that geomagnetic excursions are not spontaneous processes but rather triggered by external events which directly disrupt the flow in the Earth's core. Such processes may include the arrival of continental slabs carried down into the mantle by the action of plate tectonics at subduction zones, the initiation of new mantle plumes from the core–mantle boundary, and possibly mantle-core shear forces and displacements resulting from very large impact events. Supporters of this theory hold that any of these events lead to a large scale disruption of the dynamo, effectively turning off the geomagnetic field for a period of time necessary for it to recover.

Substantial cosmic impact
Richard A. Muller and Donald E. Morris suggest geomagnetic reversal due to very large impact event and following rapid climate change. The impact triggered a little ice age and change of water redistribution more to poles alters the rotation rate of crust and mantle. If the sea-level change is sufficiently large (>10 meters) and rapid (in a few hundred years), then the velocity shear in the liquid core disrupts the convective cells that drive the Earth's dynamo.

Effects

Due to the weakening of the magnetic field, particularly during the transition period, greater amounts of radiation would be able to reach the Earth, increasing production of beryllium 10 and levels of carbon 14. However, it is likely that nothing serious would occur, as the human species has certainly lived through at least one such event; Homo erectus and possibly Homo heidelbergensis lived through the Brunhes–Matuyama reversal with no known ill effect, and excursions are shorter-lived and do not result in permanent changes to the magnetic field.

The major hazard to modern society is likely to be similar to those associated with geomagnetic storms, where satellites and power supplies may be damaged, although compass navigation would also be affected. Some forms of life that are thought to navigate based on magnetic fields may be disrupted, but again it is suggested that these species have survived excursions in the past.
Since excursion periods are not always global, any effect might well only be experienced in certain places, with others relatively unaffected. The time period involved could be as little as a century, or as much as  years.

Relationship to climate
There is evidence that geomagnetic excursions are associated with episodes of rapid short-term climatic cooling during periods of continental glaciation (ice ages).

Recent analysis of the geomagnetic reversal frequency, oxygen isotope record, and tectonic plate subduction rate, which are indicators of the changes in the heat flux at the core mantle boundary, climate and plate tectonic activity, shows that all these changes indicate similar rhythms on million years' timescale in the Cenozoic Era occurring with the common fundamental periodicity of ~13 Myr during most of the time.

See also
 March 1989 geomagnetic storm
 Polar drift
 Solar storm of 1859

Notes

References

External links
 
  

Geomagnetic reversal